In the geometry of hyperbolic 4-space, the order-5 icosahedral 120-cell honeycomb is one of four regular star-honeycombs. With Schläfli symbol {3,5,5/2,5}, it has five icosahedral 120-cells around each face. It is dual to the great 120-cell honeycomb.

It can be constructed by replacing the great dodecahedral cells of the great 120-cell honeycomb with their icosahedral convex hulls, thus replacing the great 120-cells with icosahedral 120-cells. It is thus analogous to the four-dimensional icosahedral 120-cell. It has density 10.

See also 
 List of regular polytopes

References 
Coxeter, Regular Polytopes, 3rd. ed., Dover Publications, 1973. . (Tables I and II: Regular polytopes and honeycombs, pp. 294–296)
Coxeter, The Beauty of Geometry: Twelve Essays, Dover Publications, 1999  (Chapter 10: Regular honeycombs in hyperbolic space, Summary tables II,III,IV,V, p212-213)

Honeycombs (geometry)
5-polytopes